8500 series may refer to:

 Fujikyu 8500 series, EMU train operated by Fuji Kyuko in Japan
 Meitetsu KiHa 8500 series DMU train formerly operated by Meitetsu
 Toei 8500 series, tramcar type operated by Toei in Japan
 Tokyu 8500 series, EMU train type operated by Tokyu in Japan